Mummy the Peepshow is an all-girl garage punk/noise punk band from Osaka, Japan. Formed in 1994, they recorded four full-length albums and were featured in many album compilations. In 2000, they performed at the U.S. music festival SXSW as part of Japan Nite. They had been part of Audrey Kimura's Tokyo-based BENTEN Label until they formed their own label, Triangle Records, in 2001. They went on hiatus in 2003 but Maki reformed the band with a new line-up in 2018 and have performed several shows since then.

Discography 
 Mummy Builion (1998, BENTEN Label)
 "Mummify" - 3:00
 Kaiketsu! Pubbuta 200 kg(Man of Extraordinary Talent! Fatty 200 kg) - 2:54
 "MTP Pt 2" - 2:04
 "Go Mad" - 2:00
 "D For Die" - 0:52
 "Fairytale in the Supermarket" - 3:37
 "I Bub You Bub" - 4:57
 "Theme of Ten Chel" - 1:28
 "We Mummyfied" - 1:28

 This is Egg Speaking... (1999, BENTEN Label)
 "We Are" - 3:38
 "Dear Big Tongue" - 2:37
 "Jenny is Feeling Bad" - 3:31
 "Annie" - 1:51
 "Wonder Bread Angel Soup" - 2:31
 "Dirty Snowy Red Coat" - 2:04
 "Spring Pants Has Come" - 3:13
 "Ne Sois Pas Si Bete" - 2:24
 "Rock Me Bartender" - 4:34

 Electric Rollergirl (2000, BENTEN Label)
 "Disco Holiday" (Maki) - 2:26 
 "Skip! Skip!" (Maki) - 3:30
 "Kick Off!" (Music: Aki, Words: Maki) -  3:13
 "Girl Friend" (Maki) - 3:44
 "Bathtime Tune" (Maki) - 3:00
 "Humming Swing Cycling" (Aki) - 2:14
 "I'm Not" (Naru) - 2:26
 "Honey & Sandwich" (Maki) - 3:49
 "This Charming Man" (Johnny Marr, Morrissey) - 2:45
 "Starway" (Maki) - 8:04
 "Good Bye My Roller Girl" (Maki) - 3:11

 Schoolgirl Pop (2002, Triangle Records)
 "Hide-And-Seek On The Turntable" (Maki) - 3:01
 "School Girl Pop" (Maki) - 2:06
 "Red Guitar Story" (Maki) - 2:22
 "CUT" (Maki) - 3:08
 "Good Morning!" (Maki) - 2:54
 "Sailing" (Maki) - 2:39
 "Hello Stan" (Naru) - 3:08
 "Good Bye" (Maki) - 1:38
 "In A Hospital" (Maki) - 3:22
 "Lady Wendy" (Maki) - 3:05
 "Good Night" (Maki) - 2:03
 "(Give Me A) Letter!" (Maki) - 4:08

Lineups 
The band has gone through several lineup changes, but has always included founder, lead vocalist and guitarist Maki Mummy (real name Maki Nakamura).

In 1994, the original lineup featured Maki Mummy on guitar and lead vocals, Rising Yuki-San on drums and Natsu Summer on bass.

In 1997, Youngest Aki (Akiko Hosoya) joined the group on lead guitar.

In 1999, Rising Yuki-San married and left the band. I*D*M*U (Mayuko Iida) joined as their drummer.

In 2000, Naru☆Shin (Naru Ishizuka, now a member of Shonen Knife) joined the band, replacing Natsu Summer on bass.

Around 2001 (precise date unknown) Aki left the band.

In 2018, after being on hiatus, the band was reformed with a new line-up, with Akibon on lead guitar, Agya on drums and Yuko on bass.

Video Game Easter Egg 
Mummy the Peepshow was featured as an easter egg in the 2005 video game Far Cry Instincts for the Xbox console. Entering a special button combination on the controller in the video game's Map Editor would reveal a special message that says "MtP! Maki! Naru! Mayu! Aki!", referencing the Electric Rollergirl line up of the band.

References

External links 
Official Mummy the Peepshow page (inactive since 2003)
Official Mummy the Peepshow page at Benten Sister
BENTEN Label's main page, featuring other girl punk bands

Japanese rock music groups
Japanese punk rock groups
Musical groups from Osaka